Speaker of the Kerala Legislative Assembly is the presiding officer of the Legislative Assembly of the state of Kerala, the main law-making body for the Kerala. He is elected by the members of the Kerala Legislative Assembly. The speaker is always a member of the Legislative Assembly.

A. N. Shamseer is the incumbent speaker of the Kerala Legislative Assembly.

Eligibility
The Speaker of the Assembly:

 Must be a citizen of India;
 Must not be less than 25 years of age; and
 Should not hold any office of profit under the Government of Kerala.

Powers and Functions of the Speaker
The speaker of the legislative assembly conducts the business in house, and decides whether a bill is a money bill or not.  They maintain discipline and decorum in the house and can punish a member for their unruly behaviour by suspending them. They also permit the moving of various kinds of motions and resolutions such as a motion of no confidence, motion of adjournment, motion of censure and calling attention notice as per the rules. The speaker decides on the agenda to be taken up for discussion during the meeting. The date of election of the speaker is fixed by the Governor of Kerala. Further, all comments and speeches made by members of the House are addressed to the speaker. The speaker is answerable to the house. Both the speaker and deputy speaker may be removed by a resolution passed by the majority of the members.

List of the speakers

References

Speakers of the Kerala Legislative Assembly
Members of the Kerala Legislative Assembly